Shimmer may refer to:

 Shimmer (play), a 1988 play by John O'Keefe
 Shimmer (comics), a DC Comics super-villain
 Shimmer (novel), by Eric Barnes
 Shimmer Magazine, or Shimmerzine, a speculative fiction magazine
 "Shimmer" (Fuel song), 1998
Shimmer (Notaker song), 2017
 Shimmer (Bitter Grace album), 2005
 Shimmer (Surgery album), 1994
 Shimmer, a genie with pink hair in Shimmer and Shine
 Shimmer Women Athletes, a female wrestling company
 "Shimmer", an episode of the first season of the TV series Smallville
 New Shimmer, a Saturday Night Live parody product notable for being "a floor wax and a dessert topping"

See also
 
 
 Shim (disambiguation)